Dr. Narayana Kurup Jayaraj (Malayalam: എന്‍. ജയരാജ്‌‌) (born 1 January 1956) is an Indian politician and is the current Chief Whip and MLA representing  KCM. Son of Shri K. Narayana Kurup and Smt. K. Leela, Dr. N. Jayaraj was a member of the state committee of Kerala Youth Front (M). He is also a founding member of Sanskruti, a movement for the cultural development of the Vazhoor locality.

He is awarded Ph.D. from Kerala University on the topic "Revenue Expenditure Pattern and its Implication on Economic Development of Kerala". He is a retired college lecturer from NSS Hindu College Perunna. He was a member of Kottayam district panchayat twice before getting elected to Kerala Legislative Assembly. An active participant in environmental issues and General Editor of 'Ela', an Environment Magazine, he is the founder of 'Ente Manimalayar'- an organisation for conservation of Manimalayar..

References 

http://www.niyamasabha.org/codes/13kla/members/dr_n_jayaraj.htm

1956 births
Living people
Members of the Kerala Legislative Assembly
People from Kottayam district
Kerala Congress (M) politicians